Nova Prata is a municipality in the mountainous Serra Gaúcha region of Rio Grande do Sul, in southern Brazil. It is in the Guapore micro-region of the Nordeste Rio-Grandense meso-region of the state.

Geography
The municipality occupies an area of 258.864 km² or 259 km². In 2020 the population was estimated to be 27,648. Temperature ranges from a minimum of 14 °C to a maximum of 28 °C with an annual average of 20 °C.

Nova Prata is surrounded by the municipalities of: André da Rocha and Guabiju to the north; Fagundes Varela and Vila Flores to the south; Nova Bassano, Nova Araçá and Vista Alegre do Prata to the west; and Protásio Alves to the east.

Twin towns
 Cittadella, Italy
  Noblesville, USA

References

Municipalities in Rio Grande do Sul